Kristina Brice is an Australian netball player in the ANZ Premiership, playing for the Northern Mystics.

Brice began her domestic league career as a training partner with the Adelaide Thunderbirds in 2015, impressing during her time on court and becoming an asset for the team. She was picked up by new team Giants Netball for the new Suncorp Super Netball league in 2017, and has remained at the club since then. Brice played at the Giants for two seasons, often as the third goal attack/shooter in the side. After the 2018 season she moved to New Zealand to play for the Northern Mystics in the ANZ Premiership competition.

References

External links
Netball NSW profile

Giants Netball players
1994 births
Living people
Suncorp Super Netball players
Adelaide Thunderbirds players
Northern Mystics players
ANZ Premiership players
Australian Netball League players
Southern Force (netball) players
Netball New South Wales Waratahs players
Australian Institute of Sport netball players
Australian expatriate netball people in New Zealand
New South Wales Institute of Sport netball players
New South Wales state netball league players
Netball players from New South Wales